"Clown" is a song by the American nu metal band Korn. It was released as the fourth single from their self-titled debut album on July 12, 1995.

Meaning
What inspired Jonathan Davis to write this song though, was an early gig in San Diego where a person in the audience was booing them and telling them to "go back to Bakersfield!" Jonathan knelt down to hear him and the guy took a swing at him. He missed and the band's manager assaulted him. The person was all tattooed and looked like a "clown" to Jonathan Davis, inspiring the title of the song and also the line "Hit me clown, because I'm not from your town." Preceding the song is a conversation with Korn fooling around at the song's recording, and in the conversation, one of the members says "I wish we could put 'Twist' on a fucking tape"; this references a track that would eventually appear on the band's next album Life Is Peachy.
A quote taken from Korn's Who Then Now? video, which serves as an introduction for the music video:

Music video
The video begins with the band walking in a hallway of a high school. There are shots of a clown balancing something on his nose. Soon, the band starts playing in a locker room which appears to be happening at night. Jonathan Davis is seen singing and, in some clips, he's sitting in a locker room inside one of the dry showers. With a few people spraying a little bit of water on his hair to tease him. This represents some of his painful experiences in high school of being teased. It also features the band in a gym with clips of jocks in their football jerseys and cheerleaders seen by someone in the halls. One of the cheerleaders goes into a bathroom and starts smiling in the dark room. She proceeds to brush her hair with her hands. Clips also show the band performing in a dark room. The video ends with the cheerleader in the bathroom taking off her shirt, showing a tattoo on her back which is the band's logo. The music video most likely could be them in the school after a football game at night. The music video was directed by McG; it first aired in April 1996, and by May it was in the top 50 rotation on MTV.

Track listing

US Radio Promo
CD5" ESK 6580
"Clown" – 4:36
Note: the back cover does not state which version this is. However, it's identical to the Radio Edit on the below European promo.

European Radio Promo
CD5" ESK 7735
"Clown" (Radio Edit) – 3:52

References

Works cited

External links
 Lyrics

Songs about clowns
1994 songs
1995 singles
Korn songs
Music videos directed by McG
Immortal Records singles
Songs based on actual events
Epic Records singles
Songs written by Reginald Arvizu
Songs written by Jonathan Davis
Songs written by James Shaffer
Songs written by David Silveria
Songs written by Brian Welch